Szonja Gávai (born 19 August 1993) is a Hungarian handballer who plays for Érd NK as a left wing.

Achievements
Magyar Kupa:
Silver Medalist: 2012, 2018
Bronze Medalist: 2010

References

External links

 Szonja Gávai career statistics at Worldhandball
 Szonja Gávai player profile on Békéscsabai Előre NKSE Official Website

1993 births
Living people
Handball players from Budapest
Hungarian female handball players
Békéscsabai Előre NKSE players